Marda may refer to:
 Marad, ancient Sumerian city
 Marda, Salfit, Palestinian town located in the Salfit Governorate
 Marda, Gumla, a village in Jharkhand, India

People with the surname
 Neha Marda (born 1985), Indian actress